Abzal S. Dean (born 23 February 1983) is a cricketer who has played one Twenty20 International for Canada. He was born at San Fernando, Trinidad and Tobago in 1983.

References

External links 

1983 births
Living people
Canada Twenty20 International cricketers
Canadian cricketers
People from San Fernando, Trinidad and Tobago